The snake (蛇) is the sixth of the twelve-year cycle of animals which appear in the Chinese zodiac related to the Chinese calendar. The Year of the Snake is associated with the Earthly Branch symbol 巳.

According to one legend, there is a reason for the order of the animals in the cycle. The story goes that a race was held to cross a great river, and the order of the animals in the cycle was based upon their order in finishing the race. In this story, the snake compensated for not being the best swimmer by hitching a hidden ride on the Horse's hoof, and when the horse was just about to cross the finish line, jumping out, scaring the horse, and thus edging it out for sixth place.

The same twelve animals are also used to symbolize the cycle of hours in the day, each being associated with a two-hour time period. The hour of the snake is 9:00 to 11:00 a.m., the time when the Sun warms up the Earth, and snakes are said to slither out of their holes. The month of the snake is the 4th month of the Chinese lunar calendar and it usually falls within the months of May through June depending on the Chinese to Gregorian calendar conversion.
The reason the animal signs are referred to as zodiacal is that one's personality is said to be influenced by the animal signs ruling the time of birth, together with elemental aspects of the animal signs within the sexagenary cycle. Similarly, the year governed by a particular animal sign is supposed to be characterized by it, with the effects particularly strong for people who were born in any year governed by the same animal sign.

In Chinese symbology, snakes are regarded as intelligent, with a tendency to lack scruples.

Years and elements
People born within these date ranges can be said to have been born in the "Year of the Snake", while also bearing the following elemental sign:

In Japan, the new sign of the zodiac starts on 1 January, while in China it starts, according to the traditional Chinese calendar, at the new moon that falls between 21 January and 20 February, so that persons born in January or February may have two different signs in the two countries, but persons born in late February (i.e. on or after 20 February) automatically have one sign in both countries.

Basic astrological associations

The snake is the sixth of the twelve signs and belongs to the second trine, with the ox (second sign, 牛, Earthly branch: 丑) and the rooster (tenth sign, 雞/鷄 [simplified Chinese: 鸡], Earthly branch: 酉), with which it is most compatible. The pig is the most incompatible.

Cultural notes 
A Snake Year is sometimes referred to as a Little Dragon Year to assuage possible feelings of inadequacy among people born during a Snake Year.

Gallery
Depictions of zodiacal snakes, alone or with the other eleven signs, show how they have been imagined in the calendrical context.

See also
Snake
Snakes in Chinese mythology
Snakes in mythology
Serpent (symbolism)

Notes

References
Eberhard, Wolfram (2003 [1986 (German version 1983)]), A Dictionary of Chinese Symbols: Hidden Symbols in Chinese Life and Thought. London, New York: Routledge.

External links

Chinese astrological signs
Vietnamese astrological signs
Legendary serpents